The Jameson-Richards Gas Station is a historic automobile service station on Arkansas Highway 367 in Bald Knob, Arkansas.  Built in the early 1930s, it is a typical period roadside service building, a single-story brick structure with English Revival styling.  It is rectangular in plan, with a projecting porte-cochere that has Tudor style half-timbered stucco in its gable end.  The main garage bays have original two-leaf swinging doors, and the office area has original multipane casement windows.  It stands near the Jameson-Richards Cafe, a similar period roadside building.

The building was listed on the National Register of Historic Places in 1991.

See also
National Register of Historic Places listings in White County, Arkansas

References

Gas stations on the National Register of Historic Places in Arkansas
Buildings and structures completed in 1931
Buildings and structures in Bald Knob, Arkansas
National Register of Historic Places in White County, Arkansas